The USTA Challenger of Oklahoma is a professional tennis tournament played on outdoor hard courts. It is currently part of the ATP Challenger Tour. It is held annually in Tulsa, United States since 1999.

Past finals

Singles

Doubles

References

External links
Official website
ITF search

ATP Challenger Tour
Hard court tennis tournaments in the United States
Recurring sporting events established in 1999
1999 establishments in Oklahoma
Sports in Tulsa, Oklahoma